Psilogramma vates is a moth of the  family Sphingidae. It is known from Sri Lanka.

References

Psilogramma
Moths described in 1875
Endemic fauna of Sri Lanka